Harry Muth Hollins (August 25, 1932 – June 29, 1989) was a four-term Democratic member of the Louisiana House of Representatives from Lake Charles in Calcasieu Parish in southwestern Louisiana. His tenure extended from 1964 to 1980 during the administrations of Governors John McKeithen and Edwin Edwards.

Hollins died at the age of fifty-six. He is interred at Orange Grove Cemetery in Lake Charles. Hollins' extensive archival materials are located at McNeese State University in Lake Charles.

References

1933 births
1989 deaths
Politicians from Lake Charles, Louisiana
Businesspeople from Louisiana
American real estate businesspeople
Democratic Party members of the Louisiana House of Representatives
20th-century American businesspeople
20th-century American politicians
Burials in Louisiana